Paratapes textilis is a species of saltwater clam, a marine bivalve mollusk in the family Veneridae, the Venus clams.

Description
These shells are elongate, elliptical-ovate and moderately inflated, with rounded margins. The outer shell surface is smooth, glossy, pale yellowish-white, with pale purplish grey inverted V-shaped markings. Hinge is narrow, with three radiating cardinal teeth.

Distribution
This species is present in Indian Ocean and in South Africa.

Habitat
These bivalves live on sandy bottoms or attached to rocks, at depths of up to 4 metres.

References

Veneridae
Bivalves described in 1791
Taxa named by Johann Friedrich Gmelin